Abdoulaye Sylla (born 2 February 1995) is a Guinean international footballer who plays for Hafia FC, as a goalkeeper.

Career
He has played club football for Horoya AC and Hafia FC.

He made his international debut for Guinea in 2015.

References

1995 births
Living people
Guinean footballers
Guinea international footballers
Horoya AC players
Hafia FC players
Association football goalkeepers